Mocking of Christ or Christ Crowned with Thorns is an oil on canvas painting by Annibale Carracci, probably produced in Rome in 1598–1600, between his work on the Camerino Farnese and his starting work on the Galleria Farnese frescoes. It is now in the Pinacoteca Nazionale di Bologna, which acquired it from a London art dealer.

References

1598 paintings
Paintings by Annibale Carracci
Carracci
Paintings in the collection of the Pinacoteca Nazionale di Bologna